Swantham Sarika is a 1984 Indian Malayalam movie directed by Ambili. The film was and produced by P. Muhammad Moosa. Venu Nagavally, Manochithra, Sukumari and Adoor Bhasi in the lead roles.

The film obtained the best singer award of Kerala state film awards in 1984 for K. J. Yesudas.

Cast
 Venu Nagavally 
 Manochithra 
 Sukumari 
 Adoor Bhasi 
 Bharath Gopi 
 Sudha
 Kunchan  
 Kuttyedathi Vilasini 
 M. S. Thripunithura
 Mala Aravindan
 Ravi Menon 
 Sumithra

Soundtrack

Award Song
 Ee Marubhoovil Poomaram

References

External links
 

1984 films